Michel, Michelle or Michele Martin may refer to:

Michele Francisca Martin (born 1946), American fine art painter, a/k/a Michele Martin Taylor
Michel Martin, American journalist and correspondent for NPR and WNET since 1980s
Michelle Martin (born 1967), Australian world champion squash player
Michelle Martin Dutroux, wife (1989–2003) and accomplice of Belgian serial killer Marc Dutroux